Esaias Reynier Snijman was a South African (Boer) politician and statesman. He was a member and chairman (1858) of the Volksraad of the Orange Free State, member of the Joint Commission for Administering the Government of the Orange Free State in 1855 and served as Acting State President in 1859.

References

Notes

Literature
 

State Presidents of the Orange Free State
Afrikaner people
Members of the Volksraad of the Orange Free State
1822 births
1884 deaths